Jervis may refer to:

Places
 Cape Jervis, South Australia
 Jervis Shopping Centre, Dublin
 Jervis Bay, New South Wales, Australia, an ocean bay and a village
 Jervis Inlet, British Columbia, Canada
 Jervis Island, now known as Rábida Island, one of the Galápagos Islands
 Jervis Street, a street in Dublin, Republic of Ireland
 Jervis Luas stop, a stop on the Dublin Luas red line

Other uses
 Jervis (name), a list of people with the given name or surname
 Baron Jervis, a title held by Royal Navy Admiral John Jervis (1735–1823)
 , a Royal Navy destroyer

See also
 
 Port Jervis, New York, United States, a city
 Jarvis (disambiguation)
 Gervis (disambiguation)